Flat Top Island is an island located close to the south-western coast of Tasmania, Australia. The  island is part of the Maatsuyker Islands Group, and comprises part of the Southwest National Park and the Tasmanian Wilderness World Heritage Site.

Fauna
The island is part of the Maatsuyker Island Group Important Bird Area, identified as such by BirdLife International because of its importance as a breeding site for seabirds. Recorded breeding seabird species are the short-tailed shearwater (400 pairs), fairy prion (5000 pairs), common diving-petrel (1000 pairs) and Pacific gull.  The island is a haul-out site for the Australian fur seal.  The Tasmanian tree skink is present.

See also

 South East Cape
 South West Cape
 List of islands of Tasmania

References

Protected areas of Tasmania
Important Bird Areas of Tasmania
Islands of South West Tasmania